Wingham (Inglis Field) Aerodrome  is a registered aerodrome located  northwest of Wingham, Ontario, Canada.

See also
Wingham/Richard W. LeVan Aerodrome

References

Registered aerodromes in Ontario